Seven Parks is a neighborhood in southwestern Lexington, Kentucky, United States. Its boundaries are Nicholasville Road to the east, Norfolk Southern railroad tracks to the west, Dantzler Drive to the north, and Arcadia Park Drive to the south.

Neighborhood statistics
 Area: 
 Population: 467
 Population density: 
 Median household income: $44,328

References

Neighborhoods in Lexington, Kentucky